Márton Oross (born 3 March 1981 in Győr) is a Hungarian football player who currently plays for Gyirmót SE.

References 
HLSZ
Haladas

1981 births
Living people
Sportspeople from Győr
Hungarian footballers
Association football forwards
Győri ETO FC players
Mosonmagyaróvári TE 1904 footballers
Kecskeméti TE players
Integrál-DAC footballers
Gyirmót FC Győr players
Szombathelyi Haladás footballers
Nemzeti Bajnokság I players
Nemzeti Bajnokság II players